The 2020–21 UNC Asheville Bulldogs men's basketball team represented the University of North Carolina at Asheville in the 2020–21 NCAA Division I men's basketball season. The Bulldogs, led by third-year head coach Mike Morrell, played their home games at Kimmel Arena in Asheville, North Carolina, as members of the Big South Conference.

Previous season
The Bulldogs finished the 2019–20 season 15–16, 8–10 in Big South play to finish in a tie for fifth place. They defeated Campbell in the first round of the Big South tournament before losing in the quarterfinals to Gardner–Webb.

Roster

Schedule and results

|-
!colspan=12 style=| Regular season

|-
!colspan=12 style=| Big South tournament
|-

|-

Source

References

UNC Asheville Bulldogs men's basketball seasons
UNC Asheville Bulldogs
UNC Asheville Bulldogs men's basketball
UNC Asheville Bulldogs men's basketball
oo